Nikolsky District is the name of several administrative and municipal districts in Russia:
Nikolsky District, Penza Oblast, an administrative and municipal district of Penza Oblast
Nikolsky District, Vologda Oblast, an administrative and municipal district of Vologda Oblast

See also
Nikolsky (disambiguation)

References